The Treasons in Wales Act 1540 (32 Hen. 8 c.4) was an Act of the Parliament of England. It gave to commissioners the authority to try people for treason committed in Wales "or where the King's writ runneth not."

See also
High treason in the United Kingdom

References

Treason in Wales
Acts of the Parliament of England (1485–1603)
1540 in law
1540 in England
16th century in Wales
1540 in Wales